Tresoweshill is a hamlet in the civil parish of Germoe in west Cornwall, England, United Kingdom.

References

Hamlets in Cornwall